Robert Allan David Wilson, MBE, born in 1951 in the Scottish Borders, is an entrepreneurial business leader, musician and philanthropist. He lives in Knebworth, Hertfordshire. He was awarded an MBE in the 2016 Queen's New Years Honours for services to the music industry and charity.

Music industry 
Until May 2018, Wilson was the Chair of Sound Technology Ltd which he founded in February 1978. It is currently one of the largest independent distributors of musical instruments and professional audio products in the UK and Republic Of Ireland.  He earned a lifetime achievement award by NORD in 2018.

For the last 40 years, Wilson has been Director of the Music Industries Association (MIA), a UK trade association. It is the only one servicing and representing the interests of all UK businesses involving musical instruments and associated products. In 2003, Wilson was recognised for his 25 years' service, and received a lifetime achievement award in 2006. In 2019 he officially retired from MIA

Wilson continues to play an important part in supporting the music industry.

Charity work 
Wilson was the Director of NAMM from 2008-2011. The National Association of Music Merchants is a not-for-profit association that promotes the pleasures and benefits of making music and strengthens the $17 billion global music products industry. As president in 2005 he contributed to their Oral History project and again in 2018. Wilson received awards in recognition of his dedicated service as a Director and for his excellent service in the Music Products Industry. In 2020 he was awarded the NAMM Oral History Service Award.

References

External links

Musicians from Hertfordshire
Living people
People from Knebworth
People from Hawick
1951 births